The Scent of Green Papaya (Vietnamese: Mùi đu đủ xanh, French: L'Odeur de la papaye verte) is a 1993 Vietnamese-language film produced in France by Lazennec Production, directed by Vietnamese-French director Tran Anh Hung, and starring Tran Nu Yên-Khê, Man San Lu, and Thi Loc Truong.

The film won the Caméra d'Or prize at the 1993 Cannes Film Festival, a César Award for Best Debut at the French annual film award ceremony, and was nominated for the 1993 Academy Award for Best Foreign Language Film. It was Tran Anh Hung's first feature film and stars his wife, Tran Nu Yên-Khê. It is also his first collaboration with Vietnamese composer Tôn-Thât Tiêt who subsequently wrote the music for two more films: Cyclo and Vertical Ray of the Sun.

Although set in Vietnam, the film was shot entirely on a soundstage in Boulogne, France.

Plot
A young girl, Mùi, becomes a servant for a family that was once wealthy, but is sinking into genteel poverty due to the husband's infidelities and spending sprees. Their only income is from the wife's small business. The husband's widowed mother, an invalid who seldom leaves her upstairs room, blames her daughter-in-law, telling her, "You have a man, but you don't know how to keep him happy." The eldest son prefers his friend's company, the bookish middle son torments insects, and the youngest, who idolizes his father, is willful, disruptive, and resentful. Mùi is notably peaceful and intensely curious about the world. Having lost a young daughter during one of her husband's earlier absences, the wife is kind to Mùi, treating her like one of her own.

When the husband leaves for his fourth and final time, he steals his wife's meagre savings and jewelry. He stays away long enough for the family to almost run out of food and go hungry. He collapses soon after his return home, the wife sells an heirloom vase and other valuables to pay for medical expenses, and a doctor is summoned. As he is treated with acupuncture, musicians play cheerful music outside the room. When he dies, the wife faints and the family is shocked.

Ten years later, the family has fallen on hard times. Two sons have left, and the wife has taken the place of the grandmother upstairs, tragic and rarely seen. On the family shrine, the grandmother's and husband's photos have joined those of other departed relatives. It is determined that the household can no longer afford to keep Mùi. The heartbroken wife gives Mùi a silk dress and some gold jewelry, and Mùi become a servant for the older son's wealthy friend, who is now a concert pianist. He is engaged to be married, but seems to prefer playing the piano to spending time with his frivolous fiancée.

One night, as the fiancée chatters on, his piano playing becomes more stormy as he strives to ignore her. She leaves, but watches through the window, and sees that when Mùi enters the room, his playing becomes both passionate and peaceful. Later that night, he goes to Mùi's quarters and closes the door behind him. When the fiancée learns of this she furiously slaps Mùi, smashes some of his belongings, and then leaves her engagement ring on a table. When he returns, he calmly pockets the ring. He starts teaching Mùi to read and write. In the final scene, a visibly pregnant Mùi is reading poetry to him, and smiles.

Cast
 Tran Nu Yên-Khê as Mui, age 20 (as Trân Nu Yên-Khê)
 Man San Lu as Mui, age 10
 Thi Loc Truong as La mère (as Truong Thi Lôc)
 Anh Hoa Nguyen as La vieille Ti (as Nguyên 'Anh Hoa)
 Hoa Hoi Vuong as Khuyen (as Vuong Hòa Hôi)
 Ngoc Trung Tran as Le père
 Vantha Talisman as Thu
 Keo Souvannavong as Trung
 Van Oanh Nguyen as Mr. Thuan
 Gerard Neth as Tin
 Nhat Do as Lam
 Thi Hai Vo as La grand-mère
 Thi Thanh Tra Nguyen as Mai
 Lam Huy Bui as Le médecin
 Xuan Thu Nguyen as L'antiquaire
 Xuan Loi Phan as Musiciens
 Xuan Dung Phan as Musiciens
 Van Chung Le as Musiciens
 Tho Phuong as Le coiffeur
 Long Chau as Clientes
 Thi Van Khanh Truong as Clientes
 Hông Hanh Luguern as Clientes 
 Ba Hang Phan as Le livreur d'eau

Reception

Year-end lists
 4th – Bob Strauss, Los Angeles Daily News
 4th – David Elliott, The San Diego Union-Tribune

Awards and nominations
 1993 Cannes Film Festival Award of the Youth French Film (Anh Hung Tran) Won
 1993 Cannes Film Festival Golden Camera Award (Anh Hung Tran) Won
 1993 Camerimage Golden Frog Award Nomination (Benoît Delhomme)
 1994 Academy Award Nomination for Best Foreign Language Film
 1994 British Film Institute Award Sutherland Trophy (Anh Hung Tran) Won
 1994 César Award for Best First Work (Anh Hung Tran) Won

See also
 List of submissions to the 66th Academy Awards for Best Foreign Language Film
 List of Vietnamese submissions for the Academy Award for Best Foreign Language Film

References

External links
 
 
 

1993 films
1993 in Vietnam
Vietnamese-language films
French drama films
1993 drama films
Films directed by Tran Anh Hung
Best First Feature Film César Award winners
Caméra d'Or winners
1993 directorial debut films
Vietnamese drama films
1990s French films